Flight without a tun (ფრენა უკასროდ) is a 2001 Georgian novel by author Miho Mosulishvili.

Outline
Action of this picaresque novel Flight without a tun occurs four countries: Germany, Switzerland, Nigeria and Georgia. Difficult on a genre and, at the same time the readable and fascinating story about adventures of three protagonists, three Georgian emigrants who are on semi-legal position in German camps for refugees and, as a whole Germany. Author has called his novel wittily a "textbook". A textbook for those who may act in her poor countries law-contrary and not renounce such way of life also in Germany.

Refugee camps are places where people of different denominations and nationality form criminal groupings and, e.g., mediator's groups which connect drug mafia with drug dependent. The behaviors of the heroes is very easy and primitive, her life is a fight for drugs. Author describes the existence of his heroes ironically. Style of the story is epic sometimes and resembles him, Odyssey of Homer; and in places the author as if has a good time Rabelais's imitation and transfers the reader the hypertrophied worlds of poetic satire and humor...

The title of the novel is an allusion to Goethe's Faust. To fly away Mephistopheles and doctor Faust use a barrel from Auerbach's Cellar, but for our heroes is for such a flight also enough Joint (cannabis) filled by marihuana. During the trip they meet the souls of her forefathers who worked in Germany in the same area (Grigol Robakidze, Konstantine Gamsakhurdia, David Guramishvili). In Weimar monuments Goethe and Schiller revive and argue with heroes of the novel, the Georgian and Nigerian drug dealers. The Nigerian deity of Olokun (Yoruba god) takes part in all these disputes! With the rise in the hierarchy of the drug mafia seem chums of the Georgian emigrants extremely winning, comical and at the same time dangerous Nigerian crooks.

In the end the activity of the international crook's group ends with a failure. The German law has opposed the romantic swindling and the asylum-seekers were pushed away in her native country.

Thus becomes clear that Germany is no ideal country because crook can have her chums and, moreover, the western civilization not be shaken. On the border of tragedy and satire balancing story of the novel exists of different and clear streams of consciousness which mark in each case the single heroes.

And what is for the author especially importantly in this postmodern story in which all problems are treated – like, e.g., the antagonism between developed and non-developed countries, Globalism and Anti-globalism, feminism and anti-feminism, harmonious existence of the sexual minorities and the majorities – in witty aspects: The person as an individual and the person as a peculiar world with all his defects and his dignity is a space of the love which reconciles the author in the novel again with the world. In spite of the satire the author lets the readers fall in love in his heroes. And thus the heroes of the novel continue her life in the consciousness of the readers.

Characters
 Dito Kinkladze, Georgian crook
 Pupa Koguashvili, Georgian crook
 Kakha Burnadze, Georgian crook
 Bozo Anschibua Oduduwua, Nigerian crook
 Safa Chuku Chuku, Nigerian crook
 Willi Sabellicus, Housemaster in Germany
 Christian Shwerdtlein, A lawyer of company 'Bavua and Coll'
 Marishka, Georgian amazon
 Ananke Oro Kajja, Nigerian amazon

Release details
 2001, Georgia, ფრენა უკასროდ, Pub. date 30 May 2001, paperback (First edition - in Georgian)
 2011, Georgia, ფრენა უკასროდ, Pub. date 15 July 2011, paperback (Second edition - in Georgian)

References

External links
 How can one fly in Germany? (Review by Andro Enukidze)
 Pʻrena ukasrod : romani

Literature of Georgia (country)
2001 novels
21st-century Georgian novels
Picaresque novels
Novels set in Germany
Works by Miho Mosulishvili